USS Cheleb (AK-138) was a  in the service of the US Navy in World War II. It was the only ship of the Navy to have borne this name. It is named after Cheleb, a star in the northern hemisphere constellation of Ophiuchus.

Construction
Cheleb was laid down 29 December 1943 as liberty ship SS Lyman J. Gage, MCE hull 520, by Permanente Metals Corporation, Yard No. 1, Richmond, California, under a Maritime Commission (MARCOM) contract; launched 29 January 1943; sponsored by Mrs. E. E. Carter; and commissioned 1 January 1944.

Service history
Cheleb cleared San Francisco 20 January 1944, for Pearl Harbor, where she loaded ammunition and explosives for transportation to newly won Kwajalein, which she reached 19 February. Here her cargo, destined for use in the assault of Eniwetok which began that day, was unloaded, and on 11 March, Cheleb cleared for Port Hueneme, California, base for the Pacific Naval Construction Battalions. After delivering construction equipment at Pearl Harbor, on 18 April, she returned to Oakland, California, where she was converted to a fleet issue ship.

Cheleb loaded a varied cargo at San Francisco, and with it arrived at Kwajalein 5 June 1944, to supply ships readying for the assault on the Marianas 10 days later. Cheleb also issued stores at Majuro and Eniwetok until 2 August, when she sailed from the Marshalls for San Francisco to reload. Returning to Ulithi 15 October, she supplied ships of the vast 3rd Fleet for the next month, as they carried out their operations supporting the assault on the Philippines. She returned to the west coast to reload in December, and on 22 January 1945, arrived at Eniwetok to provision ships bound for the invasion of Iwo Jima, and later ships destined for the assault on Okinawa. Another voyage to the west coast for repairs and reloading took place in May and June, and on 22 July, Cheleb arrived in Leyte Gulf to take up the task of issuing supplies once more. During this time, she serviced some of the ships conducting the final pounding air attacks on the Japanese home islands.

Post-war decommissioning 
Cheleb arrived in Tokyo Bay 17 November 1945, and remained to issue provisions and supplies to occupation forces at the ports of Tokyo, Yokohama, and Yokosuka. She returned to San Francisco 12 May, and later sailed to Pearl Harbor, where she was decommissioned 25 July 1946. After use in a special explosives test, she was turned over to the War Shipping Administration (WSA) for disposal, her contribution to the Navy's great logistic effort at an end.

The ship was struck from the Navy list on 22 May 1947, she was returned to MARCOM the next day, and was placed in the National Defense Reserve Fleet at Suisun Bay, California.

Cheleb was sold for scrapping on 27 March 1978, to Levin Metals Corporation, for $111,653. She was delivered 19 April 1978.

Notes 

Citations

Bibliography 

Online resources

External links

Crater-class cargo ships
World War II auxiliary ships of the United States
Ships built in Richmond, California
1943 ships
Suisun Bay Reserve Fleet